The 1983 Prize of Moscow News was the 18th edition of an international figure skating competition organized in Moscow, Soviet Union. It was held November 23–27, 1983. Medals were awarded in the disciplines of men's singles, ladies' singles, pair skating and ice dancing.

Men

Ladies

Pairs

Ice dancing

References

1983 in figure skating
Prize of Moscow News